Hijas de Cuauhtémoc was a student Chicana feminist newspaper founded in 1971 by Anna Nieto-Gómez and Adelaida Castillo while both were students at California State University, Long Beach.

The Chicana movement 
Between 1970 and 1980, the Chicana feminist movement developed in the United States to address the particular issues that concern Chicanas as women of color. This movement developed out of the Chicano student’s movement. The Chicano movement centered on a wide range of matters: social justice, equality, educational reforms, and political and economic self-determination for Chicano communities in the United States. In the same way that Chicano males were questioning the historical and contemporary realities of Chicanos in the US, Chicanas established to investigate the oppressions forming their own experiences as women of color. Chicana/o studies professor Maylei Blackwel has written that the student's newspaper Hijas de Cuauhtémoc was a vital part of the uprising Chicana movement.

Founding 
Anna Nieto-Gómez, co-founder of the Hijas de Cuauhtemoc newspaper, found her inspiration from a book written by Fredrick Turner that highlighted a Mexican Revolutionary group named the same. She said that “We were motivated to start Hijas because chicana contemporaries we’re experiencing sexual harassment within chicano movement. [...] Male leadership seeking freedom and civil rights for himself and not for the included chicanas.” Anna Nieto-Gómez was exposed discrimination at a very early age, and from those experiences, she wanted to fight for the right against discrimination and sexism. She felt that the Feminist movement was a part of their Chicana history. While working as a counselor and instructor at California State University Long Beach, she mentored and organized Chicana undergraduates. As an outcome of that organization process, they published Hijas de Cuauhtémoc. Besides Anna NietoGomez, Cindy Honesto, Marta López, Corinne Sánchez, and Adelaida R. Del Castillo are the founders and chief editors of Hijas de Cuauhtémoc. The group Hijas de Cuauhtémoc became a way for women in the Chicana/o movement to organize collectively. They were able to express their experience as young, working-class Chicanas and to address issues that were ignored in the student's movement like for example their critique about machismo in the Chicano movement. The student newspaper presented new forms of feminism as they started the dialogue about the intersection of class and race. These concepts were presented through an “innovative mixed-genre format that was equal parts journalism, poetry, photography, art, social critique, recovered women history, and political manifesto". It involved economic and social issues, political consciousness and Mexicana/Chicana history. Moreover, it provided space for many young activists to express their own political insights and visions".

Support 
To print the first issue, the newspaper received financial support from a Norwalk Mutualista society, a tradition of Mexican migrant communities. In contrast to the support group, other Chicano men, especially Chicanos in the sphere of the Chicano newspaper El Alacrán were less supportive of the arising of a feminist Chicana newspaper.

Content 
The issues covered subjects like sterilization and reproduction health, welfare and labor rights, employment and gender discrimination, access to health care, Chicana incarceration, family and cultural roles, along with sexism, sexual politics and women's role in the movement.

Overall the paper encouraged Chicanas to complete their education by providing them with a support group, an organizational tool, and a forum for addressing their concerns as women. Moreover," the newspaper was a vehicle for regional communication where Chicanas spread information about their political activities, campus issues, Mexican history, the growth of Chicana feminism, women in prison, role of women in the movement and a struggle against sexism and sexual politics”. Besides working on the issues, members of Hijas de Cuauhtémoc participated in Community organizations and made links among other Chicana groups such as the La Raza Community Center in Eastside Long Beach, the UFW's grape boycott and Teatro Campesino.

First issue 
The first issue was published in March 1971, dealing with the topic of Chicanas studying at California State University at Long Beach as well as Chicana history, Chicana education, Chicanas in the Prison, Chicana poetry and socio-sexual problems in Chicano organizations and families. Even though the issue did not have extensive content, the article on "Macho Attitudes" received most attention, which was mostly negative.

Second issue 
A month later, in April the second issues were intended to circulate thoughts and ideas produced at the Los Angeles Chicana Educational Conference. The conference was planned in preparation for the first national Chicana Conference, la Conferencia de Mujeres por la Raza, which was to be held in Houston later that year. They also used the newspaper to highlight important events, such as the University Regional Conference in Houston, Texas. Through the advertising, they were able to get 250 attendees to the conference.

Third issue 
The third Issue came out in June 1971. It provided Information about Chicana Workshops at the May Educational Chicana Conference and contained information about the 5-point program of Hermanidad, the philosophy of Chicana sisterhood.

Ridicule and Resistance 
The women of Hijas de Cuauhtemoc were not taken seriously throughout the course of their existence. A mock burial for the writers of the newspaper with a MEChA “priest”, where they had tombstones made names inscribed with the names of the creators of the publication, signifying the end of their lives by working on this newspaper. MEChA stands for Movimiento Estudiantil Chicano de Aztlan, a student organization at California State University-Long Beach. MEChA did this also to take a stand to Nieto-Gómez, signifying their defiance to her newly elected seat as president of the organization, since she was female.

Transformation 
In spring 1973, original members of the Hijas de Cuauhtémoc staff formed a core founding group for Encuentro Femenil, including Anna Nieto-Gómez, Cindy Honesto, Marta López, Corinne Sánchez, and Adelaida R. Del Castillo. Hoping to expand the reach of Hijas de Cuauhtémoc, they founded the first Chicana journal centering Chicana scholarship and activism. They aimed to document community issues and struggles as well as rise greater political awareness of Chicana issues among a larger Chicana/o  community.  Additionally, the publication of Encuentro Femenil not only documented the political mobilization of Chicanas, but it encouraged new forms of Chicana political solidarity and participation.

References

Further reading 

 Love, B. (2006). Feminists who changed America, 1963-1975.
 Nieto-Gómez A., Estrella S., Castillo S. (1971) Hijas de Cuauhtémoc, State University Long Beach, California.
 Torres, Eden E. (2003) Chicana Without Apology: The New Chicana Cultural Studies, Routledge.
 López, Sonia A. (1977) The role of the Chicana within the student Movement. Pp. 16-29 in Essay on la Mujer Anthology, ed. Rosaura Sánchez and Rosa Martinez Cruz. Los Angeles: Chicano Studies Center Publications, University of California.

Mexican feminists
Defunct newspapers published in California
Intersectionality
Feminist newspapers
Chicana feminism
Chicano literature
Feminist studies scholars